William Brown House may refer to:

William Brown House (London Town, Maryland)
William H. Brown House, Allegan, Michigan
Will Q. Brown House and Wash House, Riddle, Oregon, listed on the National Register of Historic Places (NRHP)

See also
William Brown Building, Rockford, Illinois, listed on the NRHP in Winnebago County, Illinois